Karan Johar is an Indian filmmaker and television personality who works in Hindi Cinema. He has won several awards, including a National Film Award and six Filmfare Awards. In 2020, Government of India honoured him with Padma Shri, the country's fourth highest civilian award.

Johar made his directorial debut with the romantic comedy-drama Kuch Kuch Hota Hai (1998), which earned him the National Film Award for Best Popular Film Providing Wholesome Entertainment as a director and the Filmfare Awards for Best Director and Best Screenplay. His next two films were the ensemble dramas Kabhi Khushi Kabhie Gham... (2001) and Kabhi Alvida Naa Kehna (2006), which were both very successful in the domestic and overseas markets. His social drama My Name Is Khan (2010) earned him his second Filmfare Award for Best Director. These, along with the several successful films he has produced under the Dharma Productions banner, have established him as one of the leading director-producers in Hindi cinema.

Awards and nominations

Honors 
 On 30 September 2006, Johar became the first Indian filmmaker to be a jury member in the Miss World competition, in Warsaw, Poland.
 In 2007, Johar was chosen as one of 250 Global Young Leaders by the Geneva-based World Economic Forum 2006.
 He was the only other Indian apart from PM Manmohan Singh to be invited for the opening ceremony of the London Olympics.
 In 2017, Johar was invited as cultural leader in World Economic Forum.
 On 25 January 2020, his name was announced for the Padma Shri award, India's fourth highest civilian honour in the field of Arts.

See also 
 List of accolades received by Kal Ho Naa Ho
 List of accolades received by My Name Is Khan

References

External links 
 

Lists of awards received by Indian actor
Lists of awards received by film director